NHL 2013 may refer to:
2012–13 NHL season
2013–14 NHL season
NHL 13, video game
2013 National Hurling League